Nadezhda Borisovna Trubetskaya (1812 – 1909), was a Russian noblewoman and courtier. She was noted for her philanthropy, and was one of the most known philanthropists in 19th-century Russia, contributing to 40 charity organizations in care for orphans, the homeless and the Red Cross, as well as the medical care during the Russo-Turkish War (1877–78), for which she became famous.

References 
 Молева Н.М. Надежда Трубецкая // Москва - столица. — М: Олма-Пресс, 2003. — С. 402–403. — 670 с. — .

1812 births
1909 deaths
Ladies-in-waiting from the Russian Empire
Philanthropists from the Russian Empire
19th-century philanthropists